William Russell Wyse (born January 15, 1934) was a politician from Alberta, Canada. He served in the Legislative Assembly of Alberta from 1971 to 1975 as a member of the Social Credit Party.

Wyse first ran for a seat to the Alberta Legislature in the 1971 general election, as the Social Credit candidate in the electoral district of Medicine Hat-Redcliff. He defeated Progressive Conservative candidate Jim Horsman and two other candidates.  Wyse and Horsman faced each other again in the 1975 election; Horsman defeated Wyse by over 100 votes.

References

External links
Legislative Assembly of Alberta Members Listing

Alberta Social Credit Party MLAs
Living people
1934 births